Below is a list of (known) governors of Menorca from the time of the British occupation in 1708 until the British relinquished control of the island for the last time in 1802.

Background
It was commonplace for governors to be absent from the island, and several never set foot there. Menorca changed hands several times in the 18th century. It was ruled by Britain from its initial capture in 1708 until 1756, then occupied by France for seven years until the Peace of Paris (1763) when it was returned to Britain. In 1781, the island fell to a Spanish invasion, and in 1783, Britain ceded the island to Spain. It was captured by the British for a final time in 1798 and occupied until it was returned in 1802 to Spain.

Spanish rule (15th century – 1707)
 ?
 1451: Pere de Bell-lloc i de Sentmenat
 1467–1513: Guillem de Santcliment
 1485: Guillem Ramón Dez Vall, Lieutenant of the Governor Guillem de Santcliment
 1497: Francesc de Armedans, Regent
 1513–1535: Frederic de Santcliment
 1535–1536: Pere de Figarola
 1536–1555: Francesc Girón de Rebolledo
 1555–1558: Guillem de Rocafull
 1558–1575: Joan de Cardona i Rocabertí
 1558 (June–July): Bartolomé Arguimbau, Regent
 1558 (July): Francesc des Cors, Horaci de Villalonga, Regents
 1575–1583: Francesc Guimerà 
 1583–1587: Miquel de Pacs
 1584: Francesc de Vives, Lieutenant of the Governor Miquel de Pacs
 1586: Pere de Lozano, Lieutenant of the Governor Miquel de Pacs
 1586 (October): Rafael Squella, Lieutenant of the Governor Miquel de Pacs
 1587: Antoni Fortuny, Regent
 1587–1593: Jeroni de Josa
 1593–1594: Pedro de Heredia (first time)
 1594: Antoni Fortuny, Regent
 1596–1597: Cosme Climent
 1597–1598: Pedro de Heredia (second time)
 1598–1600: Pablo de Blas
 1600–1612: Cristóbal de Prado
 1604–1611: Pablo de Blas, Lieutenant of the Governor Cristóbal de Prado and Captain general
 1612–1619: Gaspar de Castelvì
 1619–1621: Vicent Sanchez
 1621–1624: Juan de Castelvì
 1624–1628: Baltasar de Borja (first time)
 1628–1631: Pedro Ferrer
 1631–1633: Francisco Sureda
 1633–1636: Jayme Valenciano
 1636 (August–October): Gregorio de Villalonga (first time)
 1636–1637: Antonio de Oquendo
 1637 (May–June): Francisco Diaz
 1637 (June–October): Gregorio de Villalonga (second time)
 1637(July): Pedro de Gavara, Lieutenant of the Governon Gregorio de Villalonga
 1637–1638: Baltazar de Borja (second time)
 1637(October): Domingo de Herrera, Regent
 1638 (July–October): Martin Carlos de Mencos
 1638–1639: Domingo de Herrera
 1639 (June–July): Gregorio de Villalonga (third time)
 1639–1642: Fernando Fernandez Mazuelo
 1642–1645: Pedro Santacilia
 1645–1650: Josep de Rocabertí
 1650 (October): Jayme de Oleza
 1650–1653: Josef Esporrín
 1653 (April–August): Bernardino Andreu
 1653–1658: Antonio Imperial
 1658 (February–October): Felipe de la Nuza
 1658–1659: Bernardino Andreu
 1659 (March–August): Raymundo Torrella
 1659–1663: Isidoro Sanz
 1663 (August–October): Sebastian Duran
 1663–1664: Pedro Berga
 1664 (January–May): Josef de Borja
 1664 (May–August): Antonio de Verì
 1664–1671: Juan de Bayarte (first time)
 1671–1678: Josef Pardo (first time)
 1678–1680: Juan Domenéch
 1680–1681: Francisco Net (first time)
 1681–1684: Juan de Bayarte (second time)
 1684 (July–October): Josef Pardo (second time)
 1684–1687: Francisco Net (second time)
 1687 (March–April): Francisco Martorell
 1687 (April–October): Josef Sisternes
 1687–1691: Valentin Sanchez
 1691–1694: Francisco Net (third time)
 1694–1701: Sebastian Suau de Ventimilla
 1701–1703: Geronimo Torrijos
 1703–1706: Francisco Falcò
 1706: Geronimo Perez de Nueros
 1706 (October): Diego Leonardo Davila
 1706 (October): Francisco Net (fourth time)
 1706–1708 Joan Miquel Saura Morell

British rule (1708–1756)

Governors
 1708–1711: James Stanhope, who captured Menorca from Spain
 1712–1713: John Campbell, 2nd Duke of Argyll 
 1713–1714: Charles Mordaunt, 3rd Earl of Peterborough
 1714–1716: John Campbell, 2nd Duke of Argyll 
 1716–1718: George Carpenter
 1718–1719: George, Lord Forbes
 1733–1736: Richard Kane
 1737–1742: Algernon Seymour, Earl of Hertford
 1742–1747: John Dalrymple, 2nd Earl of Stair
 1747–1756: James O'Hara, 2nd Baron Tyrawley; he never visited Menorca and from 1747 to June 1756, control was exercised by the Lieutenant-Governor, William Blakeney.

Lieutenant-governors
 1733-1747 Philip Anstruther

French occupation (1756–1763)
 1756–1758: Hyacinthe Gaëtan de Lannion (first time)
 1758–1759: Jean Toussaint de la Pierre, marquis de Frémeur
 1759–1760: Louis-Félicien de Boffin d'Argenson et Pusignieu (first time)
 1760–1762: Hyacinthe Gaëtan de Lannion (second time)
 1762–1763: Louis-Félicien de Boffin d'Argenson et Pusignieu (second time)

British rule (1763–1782)

Governors
 1763: Sir Richard Lyttelton
 1766: George Howard
 1768: John Mostyn
 1778: James Murray

Lieutenant-governors
 1763: James Johnston
 1774: James Murray
 1779: Sir William Draper

During the absence of the Governor or Lieutenant-Governor, the island was governed by the military commandant: Colonel John Crawford until his death in 1765, and Major-General John Barlow from 1770.

Returned to Spain (1782–1798)

British occupation (1798–1802)
 1798–1800: Charles Stuart
 1800–1802: Henry Edward Fox

Restored to Spain (1802–present)

As part of the Balearic Islands, Menorca was later governed by insular councils before devolved government came into effect in 1977.

See also
 Great Britain in the Seven Years War
 Menorca – History section
 Mordaunt Cracherode

References

Sources
 
 
 Rulers.org, B. Schemmel
 Serie cronologica de los gobernadores de Menorca desde 1287 hasta 1815 inclusive
 La projecció política catalana a Mallorca a l'època dels Àustries, els governadors de les illes de Menorca i Eivissa

Menorca, governors
History of Menorca
Governors, Menorca
Governors, Menorca